Tighab (also Romanized as Tīghāb; also known as Tegha and Tūghāb) is a village in Paskuh Rural District, Sedeh District, Qaen County, South Khorasan Province, Iran. At the 2006 census, its population was 1,614, in 412 families.

References 

Populated places in Qaen County